The U.S. state of North Dakota first required its residents to register their motor vehicles and display license plates in 1911. , plates are issued by the North Dakota Department of Transportation through its Motor Vehicle Division. Front and rear plates are required for most classes of vehicles, while only rear plates are required for motorcycles and trailers.

Passenger baseplates

1911 to 1957
The 1955 (dated 1956) issue was the first North Dakota license plate that complied with these standards.

1958 to present

Non-passenger plates

References

External links
North Dakota license plates, 1969–present

North Dakota
North Dakota transportation-related lists
Transportation in North Dakota